, abbreviated to  is a private university in Japan. The main campus is located in Rokkakubashi, Kanagawa-ku, Yokohama, Kanagawa Prefecture.

History 
It was an evening school for the working youth. In 1929 the school was renamed , which had both day and evening schools (Day school: Department of Commerce / evening school: Departments of Commerce and Law). On 15 May 1930 the college moved to present-day Rokkakubashi Campus. In 1939 it added the technical departments (Mechanical Engineering, Electrical Engineering and Industrial Administration). In 1949 the college was developed into Kanagawa University, under Japan's new educational system.

The university at first had three faculties: the Faculties of Commerce and Engineering and the evening school's Faculty of Commerce. The latter history of the university is as follows:
 1950: the Faculty of Commerce was renamed Faculty of Law and Economics.
 1965: the Faculty of Foreign Languages (English and Spanish) was established.
the Faculty of Law and Economics was divided into two faculties.
 1967: the Graduate Schools of Law (master's/doctoral), Economics (master's/doctoral) and Engineering (master's courses only) were established.
 1989: Hiratsuka Campus was opened (Shonan Hiratsuka Campus today).
 the Faculties of Business Administration and Science were established.
 1990: the doctoral courses were added to the Graduate School of Engineering.
 1992: the Graduate School of Foreign Languages was established (master's courses only).
 1993: the Graduate Schools of Business Administration, Science and History & Folklore Studies were established (master's courses only).
 1995: the doctoral courses were added to the Graduate Schools of Business Administration, Science and History & Folklore Studies.
 2004: the School of Law was established.
 2006: the Faculty of Human Sciences was established.

Graduate schools 

 Graduate School of Law
 Graduate School of Economics
 Graduate School of Business Administration (at the Shonan Hiratsuka Campus)
 Graduate School of Foreign Languages
 Graduate School of Science (at the Shonan Hiratsuka Campus)
 Graduate School of Engineering
 Graduate School of History & Folklore Studies
 School of Law

Undergraduate schools 
 Faculty of Law
 Faculty of Economics
 Faculty of Business Administration (at the Shonan Hiratsuka Campus)
 Faculty of Foreign Languages
 Faculty of Human Sciences
 Faculty of Science (at the Shonan Hiratsuka Campus)
 Faculty of Engineering

Institutes 
 Library
 Institute for Legal Studies
 Institute of Economics and Foreign Trade
 Institute of International Business and Management
 Institute for Humanities Research
 Center for Language Studies
 Research Institute for Integrated Science
 Institute for Technological Research
 Institute for the Study of Japanese Folk Culture

Athletics

American football
The Kanagawa University American football team is the ATOMS.

Cheerleading
The Kanagawa University Cheerleading Club  is the WILDCATS or WINGS of Kanagawa University.

Baseball
The Kanagawa University baseball team is known for their long history of success in Kanagawa Univ. Baseball League.

Football
The Kanagawa University football team participated in the Emperor's Cup, in 1997,2006,2016.

Rugby
The Kanagawa University Rugby Football Club

Kendo
The Kanagawa University kendo club. Graduates of the Kendo club include Hiroyasu Koga, Yukio Mishima Harakiri(Seppuku) supported("Mishima Incident"1970).

Ekiden
The Kanagawa university ekiden team won the Hakone Ekiden, in 1997, 1998.

Alumni
Kanagawa University students have become businessmen, leading politicians, writers, architects, athletes, actors, musicians, scientists, engineer, and video game developers. Among the notable alumni are:
 Hideo Kamio,  vice-president  of Toyota
 Takeo Masuda, vice-president of ITOCHU
 Lynn Okamoto, Mangaka of Gokukoku no Brynhildr, Elfen Lied
 Yuuhei Sato, Governor of Fukushima Prefecture
 Nobuo Uematsu, video game composer of Final Fantasy series by Square Enix

References

External links 

 

 
Educational institutions established in 1928
Private universities and colleges in Japan
Universities and colleges in Yokohama
1928 establishments in Japan